A wafer is a crisp, often sweet, very thin, flat, light biscuit, often used to decorate ice cream, and also used as a garnish on some sweet dishes. Wafers can also be made into cookies with cream flavoring sandwiched between them (e.g., Oreo). They frequently have a waffle surface pattern but may also be patterned with insignia of the food's manufacturer or may be patternless. Some chocolate bars, such as Kit Kat and Coffee Crisp, are wafers with chocolate in and around them.

Communion wafers

A communion wafer is a type of unleavened bread consumed after transubstantiation as part of the Christian ritual of communion.

Spa wafer

Special "spa wafers" (Czech: lázeňské oplatky, Slovak: kúpeľné oblátky) are produced in the spa towns of the Czech Republic and the Slovak Republic (e.g. Piešťany). The production of the wafers in Karlsbad and Marienbad was traditional to the towns' German-speaking population, who, after the ethnic cleansing of the area, brought the craft to Germany.

Christmas wafer
Christmas wafers are made of only wheat flour and water. Their patterns often depict religious scenes, are a Central European Roman Catholic Christmas tradition celebrated in Polish, Slovak, Lithuanian and Italian families on Christmas Eve. These do not have sacramental value like the communion wafer. Christmas wafers are symbolic bread to share among guests to emphasize the close relationship by eating bread together. This gesture has a positive meaning, but additional wishes are often made as well. They are called opłatek (Latin: oblatum) in Polish, as opposed to wafel, which denotes a common wafer.

Oblea

A variation of a wafer, considered a part of the traditional cuisine in Argentina, Colombia, Ecuador, Guatemala, El Salvador, Venezuela, and México, is known as an oblea. It is usually eaten as a dessert with two pieces filled with arequipe, dulce de leche (milk caramel), and/or condensed milk in the middle. In some places, they might contain cheese, fruits, or chantilly cream, among others.

Pink wafer
The pink wafer is a wafer-based confectionery originally made by Edinburgh's Crawford's Biscuits in the United Kingdom. It is now made by United Biscuits, the company that took over the firm in 1960, still using the Crawford's name. The snack consists of crème sandwiched between wafers (dyed pink).

There is a similar product branded Pink Panther wafers.

Freska

Freska is an Egyptian wafer sold only on beaches in the summertime. It is made from two thin circular wafers filled with a thin layer of honey syrup.

Variations

Flavours
Some wafers are produced with a chocolate covering. Another popular flavor is lemon.

Shapes
Piroulines and Barquillos are wafers rolled into a tube, and sometimes filled with cream.

See also

Waffle, the pressed cake
Loacker, an Italian wafer manufacturer
Elledi, an Italian wafer confectionery and manufacturer
Manner, Austrian confectioner known for wafers
Neapolitan wafer, the chocolate and hazelnut cream sandwiched wafers
Nilla wafers, a thicker, small, round American cookie with a vanilla flavor
Mille-feuille, the French layered pastry
Pirouline, a rolled wafer, filled with a flavored creme
Stroopwafel, the Dutch thin, caramel filled waffle
Tompouce, the Benelux pastry
Trakinas, a Brazilian wafer brand
Horalky, the Slovak wafer bar
ANZAC wafer, the ironic term for army-issue hardtack biscuit in World Wars I and II

References

External links

Cakes
Cookies
Cookie sandwiches
Chocolate-covered foods